In mathematics, Carlitz polynomial, named for Leonard Carlitz, may refer to:

Al-Salam–Carlitz polynomials
Tricomi–Carlitz polynomials